The Killjoys is a Canadian alternative rock band who formed in 1992 in Hamilton, Ontario. The group enjoyed moderate success in Canada during the grunge/alternative rock heyday of the 1990s before disbanding in 1999. The band has reformed and disbanded on and off since 2002.

Overview
The Killjoys released their first album Starry in 1994 through Cargo Records; the album was later re-released on Warner Music Canada.  The singles "Today I Hate Everyone" and "Dana" were played on MuchMusic and MusiquePlus. Mike Trebilcock was also nominated for a Juno Award with Antoine Moonen in 1994, for "Best Album Design" for "Starry". The band was also nominated for a Rock Radio Award for "Independent Artist of the Year".

In 1996, the band released their second album, Gimme Five. The album's lead single, "Rave + Drool", was included on the very first Big Shiny Tunes compilation album. The band received a Juno Award for "Best New Group" in 1997.

In 1998, the band released their third album, Melos Modos. After filming a music video in Mexico for the album's lead single "I've Been Good", the film was stolen by a crew member. The crew member demanded $13,000, threatening to destroy the film otherwise. The ransom was paid and the footage was returned safely.

In April 1999, the band released a live album entitled Onenight and a Morningafter. In June 1999, The Killjoys signed to Shoreline Records. In 2000, lead singer/guitarist Mike Trebilcock released a solo album entitled Shield Millions. After three years of inactivity, The Killjoys reunited in 2002 for another performance. A "best of" compilation was released in 2005 called Essentials.

Gene Champagne formed Junior Achiever, and released "All the Little Letdowns" in 2008. His current band is The Unteens, and he is also the drummer for Canadian band Teenage Head.

Mike Trebilcock is a film composer, scoring such films as the award-winning 2021 horror/comedy, Crabs!, and The Fight Machine, an action/drama film directed by Andrew T. Hunt, based on The Fighter by Craig Davidson.

In 2011, The Killjoys were featured on a compilation entitled, "Today I Hate Everyone - Perfect Songs For A Crappy Day", alongside The Ramones, Ween and Hüsker Dü.

In March 2015, The Killjoys reunited for a show in Hamilton that coincided with the Juno Awards being held there that month. The band played a few more shows over the next two years, after which bassist Shelley Woods quit the band and the band decided to break up again.

In 2022, The Killjoys reunited again, performing their first show since 2017 on October 1, 2022 at the Horseshoe Tavern in Toronto.

Popular culture

"Rave + Drool", "Soaked", "Any Day Now", "Today I Hate Everyone" and "I've Been Good" were frequently included in the repertoire of Canadian Alternative DJ, DJ SDGV.
The songs "Monkeysucker" and "Everything" were used in the 1997 film The Boys Club.
"Candyland" was used in the film "Sweet Karma" (2009).
"Today I Hate Everyone" was used in the 2014 film "Wet Bum".

Members 
Mike Trebilcock is the band's primary songwriter, and he plays guitar and sings lead vocals. Gene Champagne plays the drums and Shelley Woods plays the bass and provides back-up vocals.

Discography 
 Starry (1994), Cargo Records / Warner Music Canada
 Gimme Five (1996), Warner Music Canada
 Melos Modos (1998), Warner Music Canada
 Onenight and a Morningafter (1999), Shoreline Records
 Essentials (2005), Rhino Entertainment / Warner Music Canada
 Hi-Five (2006), Rhino Entertainment
 Today I Hate Everyone - Perfect Songs For a Crappy Day (Various Artists) (2011), Warner Music Canada

Singles

References 

Musical groups established in 1992
Musical groups from Hamilton, Ontario
Canadian alternative rock groups
Juno Award for Breakthrough Group of the Year winners
1992 establishments in Ontario